Plain View, Virginia may refer to:
Plain View, King and Queen County, Virginia
Plain View, Powhatan County, Virginia